Statistics of Nadeshiko.League in the 2006 season. Nippon TV Beleza won the championship.

Division 1

First stage

Second stage

Championship playoff

Position playoff

League awards

Best player

Top scorers

Best eleven

Best young player

Division 2

Result 

 Best Player: Hiromi Katagiri, Albirex Niigata Ladies

Promotion/relegation series

Division 1 promotion/relegation series 

 Ohara Gakuen JaSRA LSC Promoted to Division 1 in 2007 Season.
 Speranza FC Takatsuki Relegated to Division 2 in 2007 Season.

See also 
 Empress's Cup

External links 
  Nadeshiko League Official Site
 Season at soccerway.com

Nadeshiko League seasons
1
L
Japan
Japan